Chris Cosgrave (born 24 July 2001) is an Irish rugby union player, currently playing for United Rugby Championship and European Rugby Champions Cup side Leinster. His preferred position is fullback.

National team
Cosgrave represents the Ireland national rugby sevens team on the World Rugby Sevens Series. He debuted for the national sevens team in 2021.

References

External links
itsrugby.co.uk Profile

2001 births
Living people
Irish rugby union players
Leinster Rugby players
Rugby union fullbacks
Ireland international rugby sevens players